Wülknitz is a municipality in the district of Meißen, in Saxony, Germany.

History
Wülknitz was the first time in 1262, Lichtensee in 1032, Tiefenau in 1013 and Peritz mentioned in records in 1266.

In 1730 August the Strong held a grand military exercise near Zeithain. At this occasion an opera house was built in Streumen.

On 1 January 1994 joined the current districts Heidehäuser, Lichtensee, Peritz, Streumen, Tiefenau (since November 1, 1952 by incorporation of a district Lichtensee) and Wülknitz to present Wülknitz community together.

References 

Meissen (district)